Bad Hair Day: The Videos is a VHS release of four of "Weird Al" Yankovic's music videos.

The VHS contains the following videos:
"Amish Paradise" (Bad Hair Day)
"Gump" (Bad Hair Day)
"Headline News" (Permanent Record: Al in the Box)
"Money For Nothing/Beverly Hillbillies." (UHF)

External links 
 

"Weird Al" Yankovic video albums
1996 video albums
Music video compilation albums
1996 compilation albums
Scotti Brothers Records albums
Scotti Brothers Records compilation albums
1990s English-language films